Harold North Fowler (February 25, 1859 - September 29, 1955) was an American classicist. He was married to Mary Blackford Fowler. He was the original translator of a number of Plato's works for the Loeb Classical Library collection.

References

External links

1859 births
1955 deaths
American classical scholars
Translators of Ancient Greek texts